Casalpusterlengo is a comune (municipality) in the Province of Lodi in the Italian region Lombardy, located about  southeast of Milan and about  southeast of Lodi.

It received the honorary title of city with a presidential decree on October 30, 1975. The town has a Baroque church of Santi Bartolomeo e Martino, which was built in the 14th-century but refurbished between 1602 and 1610. The town also has a communal palace and a tower from the medieval castle.

Casalpusterlengo borders the following municipalities: Turano Lodigiano, Secugnago, Brembio, Terranova dei Passerini, Codogno, Ospedaletto Lodigiano, and Somaglia.

Notable people
Carlo Arcari, Footballer
Angelo Arcari (1907-1985), Footballer
Pietro Arcari (1909-1988), Footballer
Bruno Arcari (1915-2004), Footballer
Nino Staffieri (1931-2018), Roman Catholic Bishop

External links
 Official website

Cities and towns in Lombardy